Philipa Thomas-Eudovic (born 20 September 1968) is a Saint Lucian former cricketer who played primarily as a right-arm medium bowler. She appeared in played 26 One Day Internationals for the West Indies between 2003 and 2005, claiming 22 career WODI wickets. She played domestic cricket for Saint Lucia.

References

External links

1968 births
Living people
Saint Lucian women cricketers
West Indies women One Day International cricketers
West Indian women cricketers